The 1998 Lime Rock Grand Prix was the third round of the 1998 IMSA GT Championship season and was held over two separate rounds, a WSC class race and a GT class race. The two separate races took place on May 25, 1998.

WSC Results
Class winners in bold.

GT Results
Class winners in bold.

Lime Rock Grand Prix
Lime Rock Grand Prix
Motorsport in Connecticut